"Undone – The Sweater Song" is a song by the American alternative rock band Weezer, released on the band's self-titled 1994 debut album. It was released as their debut single in 1994.

Overview
Originally, the band intended to insert various sound clips into the song but were wary of the cost of licensing them. Instead, the studio version of the song features a spoken introduction by then bassist Matt Sharp and longtime friend of the band Karl Koch, as well as an "intermission" set of dialogue between Karl and one of the founding members of Weezer's official fan club and early supporter of the band, Mykel Allan. This dialogue is frequently ad-libbed during concerts and other live recordings.

Weezer frontman Rivers Cuomo has commented on the song, saying:

Cuomo has also said that it was his attempt at writing "a Velvet Underground-type song," but he later referred to the song as an inadvertent rip-off of Metallica's "Welcome Home (Sanitarium)", with the band's metal roots showing through. 

The song was originally only known as "Undone"; however, the band decided to add "The Sweater Song" to the title after fans at their early shows repeatedly referred to the song as "The Sweater Song" or "that song about the sweater". As Cuomo thought song titles with parentheses looked "ugly", a dash was used in the title.

Composition
"Undone – The Sweater Song" is a mid-tempo alternative rock song that runs for a duration of four minutes and fifty-eight seconds. Its musical arrangement utilizes dynamics and thick distortion during the chorus in order to drive home the song's melody. According to the sheet music published at Musicnotes.com by Hal Leonard Music, it is written in the time signature of common time, with a moderately slow rock tempo of 80 beats per minute. "Undone – The Sweater Song" is composed in the key of G major. It has a basic sequence of G6–C7–D7–C7 during the intro and interludes, changes to G–C–D–C in the verses and follows G5–C5–D5–C5 at the chorus as its chord progression. The song opens with a circular riff built from picked guitar strings. The spoken dialogue features adolescent characters engaged in frivolous conversation as the band's music gradually rises in the background.

Critical reception
Tom Maginis for Allmusic wrote, "The song is not only meticulously crafted, it's smart, quirky, poignant, and insanely catchy -- all characteristics that would go on to define Weezer as a band and their debut as one of the most successful alternative rock records of the '90s."

Music video
The music video for "Undone" was Weezer's first music video. According to Rivers' Edge: The Weezer Story by John D. Luerssen, the band insisted that the video not have anything to do with a sweater; yet, Geffen received 25 treatments for the video, all involving sweaters. The video marks one of the early directorial efforts of Spike Jonze, whose pitch was simply "A blue stage, a steadicam, a pack of wild dogs." The $60,000 video was shot on a steadicam in one unbroken shot, featuring the band playing to a sped up version of the song. When played at a slower speed, the illusion is created that the band is playing the song in the correct time, yet moving in slow motion. The one shot was taken over 25 times, and the final version is between take number 15 and take number 20, in which the band had abandoned the idea of taking the video seriously at all. The humor was brought on by the frustration of shooting the same shot over and over to a sped up version of the song as well as the fact that one of the dogs defecated on Patrick Wilson's bass drum pedal. The video became an instant hit on MTV. An alternate take of the video can be found on the band's Video Capture Device DVD.

For their official video for their cover of "Africa", Weezer used a parody of the "Undone" video with stand-ins for themselves, including "Weird Al" Yankovic as Cuomo's stand-in.

Live performances
During live performances in 2005, the band would often invite a fan up to play the acoustic guitar part of "Undone" with the band. On the last night of the Foozer tour, Dave Grohl came up and played it with the band. On the 2008 Troublemaker Tour, Tom DeLonge – lead singer of the tour's opening act Angels & Airwaves – sang it as a duet with Cuomo. On their tour in 2011, the song was performed with the members of the Flaming Lips.

Track listings

US 7-inch and cassette single
A. "Undone – The Sweater Song" (LP version) – 4:55
B. "Holiday" (LP version) – 3:26

Australian CD single
 "Undone – The Sweater Song" (LP version) – 4:55
 "Mykel & Carli" – 2:33
 "Susanne" – 2:46
 "My Evaline" (erroneously listed as "Sweet Adeline") – 0:46

Australian cassette single
 "Undone – The Sweater Song" (LP version) – 4:55
 "Mykel & Carli" – 2:33

UK CD, cassette, and 7-inch blue vinyl single
 "Undone – The Sweater Song" (LP version) – 4:55
 "Mykel & Carli" – 2:53
 "Susanne" – 2:46
 "Holiday" (LP version) – 3:26

French CD single
 "Undone – The Sweater Song" (LP version) – 4:55
 "My Name Is Jonas" (LP version) – 3:23

Personnel
 Rivers Cuomo – lead vocals, lead and rhythm guitar
 Matt Sharp – bass guitar, backing vocals
 Patrick Wilson – drums
 Brian Bell – backing vocals
 Karl Koch – piano

Charts

Cover versions
The Offspring covered it in 1994 and 1995.  NewFangled Contraption covered it at every show in 2002 and 2003. The Fray, who toured with Weezer in 2005, played a cover version of this song live during 2007 touring. Bloodhound Gang covered it with a mix of Wu-Tang Clan's "Ain't Nuttin To F Wit". Punk rock band Titus Andronicus have covered the song multiple times on various tours; the band included one of these live covers on their mixtape, Titus Andronicus LLC Mixtape Vol 1. Mac DeMarco performed a version of the song in April 2013 for The A.V. Club A.V. Undercover series. In May 2013, UK Based Label Tiny Lights Recordings released a cover of the song recorded by a number of its artists to commemorate its second birthday. In 2014, Mac DeMarco performed a cover of the song for Onion's A.V. Undercover. The song was also covered by dream pop band Beach House live in 2015.

References

Bibliography
 

Weezer songs
1990s ballads
1994 debut singles
1994 songs
Music videos directed by Spike Jonze
Songs about suicide
Songs written by Rivers Cuomo
Song recordings produced by Ric Ocasek
Alternative rock ballads